Minuscule 220 (in the Gregory-Aland numbering), ε 457  (Soden), is a Greek minuscule manuscript of the New Testament, on parchment. Paleographically it has been assigned to the 13th century. It has complex contents. It has marginalia.

Description 

The codex contains a complete text of the four Gospels, on 303 parchment leaves (size ). It is written in one column per page, 22 lines per page, in very small letters.

There is also a division according to the Ammonian Sections (in Mark 234, last numbered section in 16:10), references to the Eusebian Canons are absent.

It contains lectionary markings at the margin for liturgical reading, and synaxaria.

Text 

The Greek text of the codex is a representative of the Byzantine text-type. Aland placed it in Category V.
According to the Claremont Profile Method it represents textual family Πb in Luke 1, Luke 10, and Luke 20.

History 

It was examined by Alter. Alter used it in his edition of the Greek text of the New Testament. C. R. Gregory saw it in 1887.

It is currently housed at the Austrian National Library (Theol. Gr. 337), at Vienna.

See also 

 List of New Testament minuscules
 Biblical manuscript
 Textual criticism

References

Further reading 

 

Greek New Testament minuscules
13th-century biblical manuscripts
Biblical manuscripts of the Austrian National Library